"Gernikako Arbola is the title of a song in bertso form presented both in Madrid (1853) and by the shrine of Saint Anthony at Urkiola (1854) by the Basque bard José María Iparraguirre (Spanish spelling Iparraguirre), celebrating the Tree of Gernika and the Basque liberties.

The song is an unofficial anthem of the Basques, besides the "Eusko Abendaren Ereserkia, a largely instrumental version used for official purposes in the Basque Autonomous Community. In 2007, the General Assembly of Biscay declared it the district's official anthem.

History
The popularity of the song quickly expanded (sung by the bard in Madrid venues) on the heat of the pro-fueros movement in the run-up to their definite suppression (1876) and the political unrest following it. Its echo quickly spread to the French Basque Country, where it took hold spurred by the Lore Jokoak festivals, the "Floral Games".

The song was chosen for the solemn end to the demonstration held at Pamplona in 1893, and sang along by the crowds, after widespread indignation sparked at the Spanish government's breach of fiscal terms concerning Navarre—protests known as the Gamazada.

The local newspaper La Voz de Fitero (southern fringes of Navarre) reported on the cheerful official reception in honour of the district MP Ramon Lasanta held on 30 April 1913, where an enthusiast audience sang the "Gernikako Arbola along, and demanded an encore from the music band.

The anthem was often rendered in performances by Pablo de Sarasate and Julián Gayarre. It has been called the "Marseillaise of the Basques". The tree has also inspired a passage of La prudencia en la mujer by the Spanish playwright Tirso de Molina and a sonnet of William Wordsworth.

In 2007, as set out by the 4/2007 Chartered Decision, the General Assembly of Biscay declared it the district's official anthem.

Lyrics
There are versions with four, eight or twelve stanzas.
Also, Iparragirre as a bertsolari would introduce changes during his performances.

In film
A tune based on the anthem can be heard in a test bullfight scene of The Happy Thieves, a film shot in Spain in 1961.

References

1853 songs
Basque culture
Basque music
National anthems
Regional songs
Spanish anthems
Songs about trees